"Till dom ensamma" is a song written and recorded by Mauro Scocco for his 1991 studio album Dr. Space dagbok, and released as a single the same year. The song charted at Svensktoppen for 22 weeks between 8 December 1991-10 May 1992, topping the chart. It also peaked at number 12 on the Swedish Singles Chart.

Other recordings
Date participated at Dansbandskampen 2009, performing the song, and they also recorded it for their 2010 album Här och nu!.

Charts

References

1991 singles
1991 songs
Swedish-language songs
Swedish pop songs
Songs written by Mauro Scocco
Songs about loneliness